Dowal is a village in Attock Tehsil of Attock District in Punjab Province of Pakistan.

References

Villages in Attock District